Mahlon Preston Hamilton, Jr. (June 15, 1880 – June 20, 1960), was an American stage and screen actor. He was the son of a bartender born in Baltimore, Maryland, the eldest of four children, with the rest of the siblings being girls. Census records indicate his mother died sometime around 1899.

Hamilton served with the Maryland National Guard and attended the Maryland Agricultural College (today the University of Maryland, College Park)  before turning to acting.

From 1908 through 1914, Hamilton appeared in such plays as The Great Question, Israel, When Claudia Smiles, The Chaperon,  and Overnight. He began his film career during the silent era, appearing in more than 90 films between 1914 and 1950.

Personal life and death
Hamilton married Aleta Farnum in 1918; the marriage ended in divorce in 1925.

He died in Woodland Hills, Los Angeles, California from cancer and was interred at Valhalla Memorial Park Cemetery.

Selected filmography

 The Final Judgment (1915)
 Molly Make-Believe (1916)
 The Eternal Question (1916)
 Extravagance (1916)
 The Black Butterfly (1916)
 Bridges Burned (1917)
 The Law of the Land (1917)
 The Hidden Hand (1917)
 To the Death (1917)
 The Silence Sellers (1917)
The Soul of a Magdalen (1917)
 The Waiting Soul (1917)
 The Red Woman (1917)
 More Truth Than Poetry (1917)
 The Danger Mark (1918)
 Adele (1919)
 Her Kingdom of Dreams (1919)
 Daddy-Long-Legs (1919)
 Playthings of Passion (1919)
 In Old Kentucky (1919)
 The Deadlier Sex (1920)
 Earthbound (1920)
 That Girl Montana (1921)
 The Truant Husband (1921)
 I Am Guilty (1921)
 Greater Than Love (1921)
 Under the Lash (1921)
 Ladies Must Live (1921)
 The Green Temptation (1922)
 Under Oath (1922)
 Peg o' My Heart (1922)
 Paid Back (1922)
 The Heart Raider (1923) (with Agnes Ayres)
 His Children's Children (1923)
 Little Old New York (1923)
 The Recoil (1924)
 Playthings of Desire (1924)
 Enemies of Youth (1925)
 Idaho (1925)
 The Wheel (1925)
 The Other Woman's Story (1925)
 Morganson's Finish (1926)
 Life's Crossroads (1928)
 The Single Standard (1929)
 Rich People (1929)
 Code of Honor (1930)
 Western Limited (1932)
 Mississippi (1935)
 Madame X (1937)

References

External links

1880 births
1960 deaths
University of Maryland, College Park alumni
American male film actors
American male silent film actors
Burials at Valhalla Memorial Park Cemetery
Deaths from cancer in California
20th-century American male actors
Male actors from Baltimore